Casellati is an Italian surname. Notable people with the surname include:

 Alvise Casellati (born 1973), Italian conductor
 Elisabetta Casellati (born 1946), Italian lawyer and politician

Italian-language surnames
Surnames of Italian origin